Christopher Isaack  (1691–1740) was an Irish Anglican priest in the 18th-century.

Isaack was born in Dublin; and educated at Trinity College there.  A prebendary of Emly  he was its archdeacon from 1740 his death.

References

Alumni of Trinity College Dublin
Archdeacons of Emly
18th-century Irish Anglican priests
Christian clergy from Dublin (city)
1691 births
1740 deaths